Florian Krebs (born 15 November 1988) is a German former professional footballer who played as a centre-back.

References

External links
 
 

1988 births
Living people
People from Speyer
German footballers
Footballers from Rhineland-Palatinate
Association football central defenders
3. Liga players
Regionalliga players
Karlsruher SC II players
1. FC Heidenheim players
VfL Osnabrück players
Hallescher FC players
SSV Ulm 1846 players